This is a list of  television shows and articles.

By genre or characteristic

Action series
Anthology series
Award shows
Children's television shows
List of animated television series
List of comedy television series
List of comedy-drama television series
List of cooking shows
List of court shows
List of dating game shows
List of entertainment news programs
List of fantasy television programs
List of game shows
List of horror television programs
List of late-night American network TV programs
List of medical drama television programs
List of morning television shows
List of music video television programs
List of police television dramas
List of professional wrestling television series
List of reality television programs
List of reality television show franchises
List of roast TV shows
List of romantic comedy television series
List of satirical television news programs
List of science fiction sitcoms
List of science fiction television programs
List of serial drama television series
List of situation comedies
List of sketch comedy TV series
List of soap operas
List of sports television series
List of tabloid talk shows
List of tattoo TV shows
List of teen dramas
List of teen situation comedies
List of telenovelas
List of televised academic student quiz programs
List of television game show franchises
List of television news magazines
List of television programs based on comics
List of television series about school
List of television series revivals
List of television show franchises
List of vampire television series
List of web television series
List of Western television series

By length
List of animated television series by episode count
List of anime franchises by episode count
List of anime series by episode count
List of longest-running Australian television series
List of longest-running scripted U.S. primetime television series
List of longest-running television shows by category
List of longest-running UK television series
List of longest-running United States television series
List of longest-running U.S. cable television series
List of longest-running U.S. broadcast network television series
List of longest-running U.S. primetime television series
List of longest-running U.S. first-run syndicated television series
List of most watched television broadcasts
List of television programs by episode count
List of television series canceled after one episode

By location
List of American television programs by setting:
List of television shows set in Boston
List of television shows set in Chicago
List of television shows set in Dallas
List of television shows set in Las Vegas
List of television shows set in Los Angeles
List of television shows set in Miami
List of television shows set in New Jersey
List of television shows filmed in New York City
List of television shows set in New York City
List of films and TV series set in Palm Springs, California
List of television shows set in San Diego
List of television shows set in San Francisco
List of television shows set in Wisconsin
List of television shows set in Washington, D.C.
List of British television programmes by setting:
List of television shows set in Liverpool
List of television shows set in London
List of television shows set in Manchester
List of television shows set in Newcastle upon Tyne
 List of Vietnam Television programmes by setting
 List of television programmes broadcast by Vietnam Television
 List of television programmes broadcast by HTV

By name
0-9 – 
A – 
B – 
C – 
D – 
E – 
F –
G –
H –
I-J –
K-L –
M –
N –
O –
P –
Q-R –
S –
T –
U-V-W –
X-Y-Z

By nationality
List of Afghan television series
List of Albanian television series
List of Algerian television series
List of Angolan television series
List of Argentine television series
List of Armenian television series
List of Australian television series
List of Austrian television series
List of Azerbaijani television series
List of Bahamian television series
List of Bahraini television series
List of Belgian television series
List of Belizean television series
List of Bolivian television series
List of Bosnia and Herzegovina television series
List of Brazilian television series
List of British television programmes
List of Bulgarian television series
List of Burmese television series
List of Cambodian television series
Lists of Canadian television series (includes English language and French language programs)
List of Chilean television series
List of Chinese television series
List of Colombian television series
List of Croatian television series
List of Cypriot television series
List of Czech television series
List of Czechoslovak television series
List of Danish television series
List of Dominican Republic television series
List of Dutch television series
List of Ecuadorian television series
List of Egyptian television series
List of Emirati television series
List of Estonian television series
List of Ethiopian television series
List of Finnish television series
List of French television series
List of Georgian television series
List of German television series
List of Ghanaian television series
List of Greek television series
List of Hong Kong television series
List of Hungarian television series
List of Icelandic television series
List of Indian television series
List of Indonesian television series
List of Iranian television series
List of Iraqi television series
List of Irish television series
List of Israeli television series
List of Italian television series
List of Ivorian television series
List of Jamaican television series
List of Japanese television series
List of Jordanian television series
List of Kazakhstani television series
List of Kenyan television series
List of Kuwaiti television series
List of Latvian television series
List of Lebanese television series
List of Lithuanian television series
List of Luxembourgish television series
List of Macedonian television series
List of Malaysian television series
List of Mauritian television series
List of Mexican television series
List of Moldovan television series
List of Mongolian television series
List of Montenegrin television series
List of Moroccan television series
List of Nepalese television series
List of New Zealand television series
List of Nigerian television series
List of Norwegian television series
List of North Korean television series
List of Pakistani television series
List of Palestinian television series
List of Panamanian television series
List of Papua New Guinean television series
List of Peruvian television series
List of Philippine television series
List of Polish television series
List of Portuguese television series
List of Puerto Rican television series
List of Qatari television series
List of Romanian television series
List of Russian television series
List of Salvadoran television series
List of Saudi Arabian television series
List of Senegalese television series
List of Serbian television series
List of Singaporean television series
List of Slovak television series
List of Slovenian television series
List of South African television series
List of South Korean television series
List of South Sudanese television series
List of Spanish television series
List of Sri Lankan television series
List of Swedish television series
List of Swiss television series
List of Syrian television series
List of Taiwanese television series
List of Tanzanian television series
List of Thai television series
List of Trinidad and Tobago television series
List of Tunisian television series
List of Turkish television series
List of Ugandan television series
List of Ukrainian television series
List of Uruguayan television series
List of Uzbekistani television series
List of Vanuatuan television series
List of Venezuelan television series
List of Vietnamese television series
List of Yugoslav television series

By network

Other
List of television series considered the worst
List of TV series based on French-language comics
50 Years 50 Shows
List of American public access television programs
List of Web television series
List of American television programs currently in production
List of Chinese television programs by date
List of Japanese television programs by date
Lists of television specials

See also
List of television formats and genres
Lists of films